Sindhi romanisation or Latinization of Sindhi is a system for representing the Sindhi language using the Latin script.

In Sindh, Pakistan the Sindhi language is written in modified persio-Arabic script and in India it is written in Devanagari (Hindi) Script.

Sindhis living in Pakistan as well as Sindhis living in India are able to speak and understand each other, however, they cannot write to each other because of the two different scripts.

Indus Roman Sindhi Script gives ability to Sindhis and would allow Sindhis all over the world to communicate with each other through one common script.

"Indus Roman Sindhi" system is different than Haleem Brohi's Roman Sindhi (Haleem Brohee jee Roman Sindhee). Indus Roman Sindhi is developed by Fayaz Soomro.

Indus Roman Sindhi
Indus Roman Sindhi  is one system for the romanisation of Sindhi.

Alphabet chart

Elongation chart 
The alphabet of persio-Arabic Sindhi script is highly context sensitive. Many of the letters of Sindhi alphabet share a common base form diacritical marks and diacritical points place either above or below.

Basics
"Alif", (In Romanized Sindhi: alif is "A"). For example: Ambu/Anbu

"Alif" is the first letter of Sindhi alphabet and it is a base letter of Sindhi alphabet. Though in Sindhi there are no vowels but the below mentioned letters and compound letters considered almost as vowels in Sindhi language and all of them are formed with the help of alif.

Roman Sindhi Vowels/رومن سنڌي سُر/ सुर

अ आ इ ई उ ऊ

A aa i ee u oo

اُو اُ اِي اِ آ اَ

ए ऐ ओ औ अं ह

e ai o au a'n h

ھَ اَنّ اَؤ او اَي ئي
 

In Indus Roman Sindhi, English alphabet's letter "A" stands for alif, "AA" stants for alif mand aa and alif zabar and  ubho alif (vertical alif).

Consonants
() is the second letter of Sindhi alphabet.

For example: Badak

The chart shows different sounds of "B"

Peculiar sounds of Sindhi language

There are six peculiar sounds in Sindhi language, four of them known as "Chaar choosinna aawaz" (sounds made with back of the tongue) and two other peculiar sounds, known as Nasalization Consonant or Nasal sounds or "Noonaasik or Nikwaan (weenjann) aawaz (Phoneme)".

The chart of four peculiar Chaar choosinna aawaz sounds

The chart of two peculiar 'Nasal sounds' or "Noonaasik or Nikwaan (weenjann) aawaz" sounds
When you make a speech sound, air usually passes through your oral cavity and comes out of your mouth. But you can also direct the flow of air through your nose, making a nasal sound.

To get the air to come out of your nose, you lower your velum. This opens up your nasal cavity and lets the air out through your nostrils. You can let air out through your nose and mouth at the same time: This makes a nasalized sound.

Nasal consonants are made by closing the mouth at specific places of articulation and opening the velum. The resulting nasal consonants are called stops because the oral cavity is closed, but air still flows out through the nasal cavity.

This Sindhi alphabet's letter is one of four peculiar "chaar choosinna aawaz" sounds and in Indus Roman Sindhi it stands as "BB". For example: Bbakiri

The chart shows different sounds of "BB"

Multi purpose use of "D"
The Roman letter "D" is some times used as Aspirates in Roman Sindhi. For example: d', dd and some times with the combination of letter "H", suppose: dh or ddh to make peculiar sounds of Sindhi language.

"A" is used as "Alif" and as Zabar (diacritical uppar mark) in Roman Sindhi

A table that shows the examples of Zabar (diacritical upper mark) in Roman Sindhi

Romanization of Sindhi words
There is a difference between transliteration and Romanisation. The present modified persio-arabic script of Sindhi language is highly context sensitive. Many of the letters of Sindhi alphabet share a common base form diacritical marks and diacritical points place either above or below (Zer, Zabar and peshu). Therefore, through transliteration, the Romanization of Sindhi words is not possible. Therefore, each and every word should be Romanized separately from persio-arabic script into Roman Sindhi script.

See also

 Romanizations of Chinese
 Romanizations of Hindi
 Romanization of Russian
 Romanization of Japanese
 Romanization of Arabic
 Romanization of Hebrew
 Romanization of Greek
 Romanization of Ukrainian
 Romanization of Persian
 Romanization of Bulgarian
 Romanization of Armenian

References

Sindhi language
Romanization of Arabic
Romanization of Brahmic